Joey Jamie Falzon (born 2 October 1969) is a former professional footballer and current manager of Maltese First Division side St. George's. Throughout his career he played as a defender, and as a midfielder. Born in Australia, he represented the Malta national team.

Falzon played for the Malta national football team in the 1990 Rothman's Tournament.

References

Living people
1969 births
Soccer players from Melbourne
Australian people of Maltese descent
People with acquired Maltese citizenship
Maltese footballers
Malta international footballers
Żurrieq F.C. players
Luqa St. Andrew's F.C. players
Siggiewi F.C. players
Mqabba F.C. managers
Association football forwards
Association football midfielders
Australian soccer coaches
Maltese football managers